Aga Khan Mintu is a Bangladesh Awami League politician and the incumbent Jatiya Sangsad member representing the Dhaka-14 constituency.

Career 
Mintu served as the commissioner of Gabtali-Mirpur area in 1994. He was the vice president of Greater Mirpur Thana Awami League. He is currently the president of Shahali Thana Awami League.

Aslamul Haque, the previous Jatiya Sangsad member from the Dhaka-14 constituency, died in office on 4 April 2021. Mintu was then elected uncontested in that vacant position on 24 June in a by-election.

References 

Living people
People from Dhaka District
11th Jatiya Sangsad members
Awami League politicians
Year of birth missing (living people)
Place of birth missing (living people)